Neslandsvatn Station is a railway station located in Neslandsvatn in Drangedal, Norway on the Sørlandet Line. The station is served by express trains to Kristiansand and Oslo.

History
The station was opened on 2 December 1927 when the Sørland Line opened to Kragerø Station. In 1935, the Sørland Line was extended to Arendal Station, while the line to Kragerø was transformed to the Kragerø Line.

References

Railway stations on the Sørlandet Line
Railway stations in Vestfold og Telemark
Railway stations opened in 1927
1927 establishments in Norway
Drangedal